The 6th Marine Infantry Parachute Regiment is an airborne infantry unit of the French Army.

Creation and different nominations since 1951 

 May 16, 1948: creation at Quimper of the 6th Colonial Parachute Commando Battalion, 6e BCCP.
 October 1, 1950: became the 6th Colonial Parachute Commando Groupment, 6e GCCP.
 March 1, 1951: became the 6th Colonial Parachute Battalion, 6e BPC.
 August 20, 1951: disbandment of the 6th Colonial Parachute Battalion, 6e BPC .
 July 5, 1952: the 6e BPC is reconstituted at Saint-Brieuc, famed as the battalion of Bigeard. 
 May 8, 1954: the 6e BPC is disbanded
 August 1, 1955: remnants of the disbanded battalion were reinforced by elements of IV/6e RTS and formed the 6th Colonial Parachute Regiment (6e RPC).
 July 10, 1957: the 6e RPC joined the 10th Parachute Division (10e DP).
 December 1, 1958: the 6th Colonial Parachute Regiment became the 6th Marine Infantry Parachute Regiment (6e RPIMa). 
 June 30, 1998: disbandment of the regiment as a result of the restructuring of the French Army.
 April 26, 2017: the flag of the 6e RPIMa is entrusted to the Initial Training Center for Non-Commissioned Members (CFIM) in Caylus. 
 April 5, 2019: the CFIM, by the agenda n° 18 of the general commanding the 11th BP, is renamed the 6e RPIMa.

History since 1948

Indochina 

The Colonial Parachute Battalions trace their origins to the 1st Colonial Parachute Commando Demi-Brigade implanted in Brittany, being heir to the paratroopers of Free France, the SAS Demi-Brigade and the groupment of parachute choc battalions.

The 6e BCCP made way to Indochina on July 28. The battalion fought valiantly on various sectors of the battle front and on March 30, 1951, the battalion resisted an enemy force four times larger for an entire night. Following a five hours of hand-to-hand combat, the battalion endured the loss of 51 men and 97 wounded.

The battalion was accordingly dissolved on August 20, 1951 during the embarking for France.

Recreated on July 5, 1952, the battalion illustrated capability at Tu Lê, in October 1952 and then Langson, in July 1953.

The 6th para engaged Dien Bien Phu twice. On November 20, 1953, the 6th, parachuted during Operation Castor and then on March 16, 1954, the 6th targeted the landing zone in the middle of the Battle of Dien Bien Phu. Despite heroic acts of valor led, the 6e BPC disappeared again, and was accordingly reconstituted.

North Africa 

Reformed in Marrakech, French protectorate of Morocco, on 1 August 1955 and named 6th Colonial Parachute Regiment. Active in the French colonies of French protectorate of Tunisia, French protectorate of Morocco and, particularly, French Algeria during the Algerian War as a part of the 10th Parachute Division,.

France 

The regiment leaves French Algeria on 6 July 1961 and regroups in Verdun. From January 1963 it was stationed in Mont-de-Marsan, the old instruction base for Colonial Parachute Brigade.

Lebanon 

The regiment partook in various peacekeeping missions in Lebanon on numerous yearly designated occasions within the UNIFIL first then integrated the corps of the Multinational Force in Lebanon during the Lebanese Civil War along with the 1st Parachute Chasseur Regiment, the 1st Parachute Hussard Regiment and the 31e Brigade which included the Operational Group of the Foreign Legion, the 1st Foreign Cavalry Regiment, the 2nd Foreign Infantry Regiment and the 17th Parachute Engineer Regiment.

The regiment was dissolved 30 June 1998.

France 

In the summer of 2017, the initial training center for non-commissioned members of the Caylus camp became "CFIM, le 6e RPIMa" then in April 2019 officially recreated under the name of 6e RPIMa.

Traditions 

Except for the Legionnaires of the 1er REG, 2ème REG, 2ème REP who wear the Green Beret, the remainder of the French army metropolitan and marine paratroopers forming the 11th Parachute Brigade wear the Red Beret.

The Archangel Saint Michael, patron of the French paratroopers is celebrated on 29 September.

The prière du Para (Prayer of the Paratrooper) was written by André Zirnheld in 1938.

Insignias 
Just like the paratrooper Brevet of the French Army, the Insignia of French Paratroopers was created in 1946. The French Army Insignia of metropolitan Paratroopers represents a closed "winged armed dextrochere", meaning a "right winged arm" armed with a sword pointing upwards. The Insignia makes reference to the Patron of Paratroopers. In fact, the Insignia represents "the right Arm of Saint Michael", the Archangel which according to Liturgy is the "Armed Arm of God". This Insignia is the symbol of righteous combat and fidelity to superior missions. The French Army Insignia of Marine Infantry Paratroopers is backgrounded by a Marine Anchor.

The insignia is mounted with an SAS dagger and was never modified, aside of the various successive inscriptions "BCCP", then "RPC", and finally "RPIMa".

Regimental colors 

The regiment was heir to the 6e BCCP created in 1948 and the 6e RPC. The Regimental Color of the 6e RPIMa, heir of the 6th parachute battalion bears the inscription "INDOCHINE" with 5 citations at the orders of the armed forces for the following:
 1950 Pho Trach and Chaple 
 1951 Mao Khé
 1952 Tu Lé
 1953 Langson 
 1954 Dien Bien Phu

The regimental color was passed to colonel Romain-Desfossés at Blida on November 5, 1957 by général Gilles.

In eleven years of campaign battles, the regiment endured the loss of 23 officers, 70 sous-officiers and 480 marsouins paratroopers.

The regiment bears wearing in golden letters in the folds, the following inscriptions:
 INDOCHINE 1949–1954
 AFN 1952–1962

Decorations 

The regimental colors of the 6th Marine Infantry Parachute Regiment is decorated with:

 Croix de guerre des théâtres d'opérations extérieures with:
 5 palms.

The regiment bears wearing 2 fourragère:
 Fourragère bearing the colors of the Médaille militaire.
 Fourragère bearing the colors of the Croix de guerre des théâtres d'opérations extérieures.

Honours

Battle honours 
 Indochine 1949–1954
 AFN 1952–1962

Regimental Commanders (1948–1998)

Notable members of the 6e RPIMa 
 Marcel Bigeard
 Erwan Bergot
 Roland Corbineau
 Pierre Tourret

See also 
 List of French paratrooper units

References

Sources and bibliographies 

 Collectif, Histoire des parachutistes français, Société de Production Littéraire, 1975.
 Colonel Roger Flamand, Paras de la France libre, Éditions Presses de la Cité, 1976, .
 Henry Corta, Les bérets rouges, Amicale des anciens parachutistes SAS, 1952.
" Change of command at CFIM ", ladepeche.fr , July 22, 2017 ( Read online , accessed July 1 , 2017 )

Parachute infantry regiments of France
Marines regiments of France
20th-century regiments of France
21st-century regiments of France
Military units and formations established in 1948
Military units and formations disestablished in 1998